Denbigh is a market town and a community in Denbighshire, Wales. Formerly, the county town, the Welsh name translates to "Little Fortress"; a reference to its historic castle. Denbigh lies near the Clwydian Hills.

History

Denbigh Castle, together with its town walls, was built in 1282 by order of King Edward I. The Burgess Gate, whose twin towers adorn the symbol on Denbigh's civic seal, was once the main entrance into the town. The first borough charter was granted to Denbigh in 1290, when the town was still contained within the old town walls. It was the centre of the Marcher Lordship of Denbigh. The town was involved in the revolt of Madog ap Llywelyn in 1294–1295; the castle was captured in the autumn, and on 11 November 1294 a relieving force was defeated by the Welsh rebels. The town was recaptured by Edward I in December. Denbigh was also burnt in 1400 during the revolt of Owain Glyndŵr.

During the Wars of the Roses (1455-1487), the town was largely destroyed, subsequently moving from the hilltop to the area of the present town market.

Leicester's Church is an unfinished church. In 1579, Robert Dudley, 1st Earl of Leicester, who was also Baron of Denbigh, planned for there to be a cathedral. His intention was to move the status of city from neighbouring St Asaph. The project ran out of money, and when Robert Dudley died, it was left as ruins; now in the care of Cadw.

In 1643, during the English Civil War, Denbigh became a refuge for a Royalist garrison. Surrendering in 1646, the castle and town walls eventually fell into ruin.

The town grew around the textile industry in the 1600s, hosting specialist glovers, weavers, smiths, shoemakers, saddlers, furriers and tanners. Denbigh has been an important location for the agricultural industry throughout.

Railway
Denbigh was served by a railway station on the former London and North Western Railway, later part of the LMS. The "Vale of Clwyd" line leading north to St. Asaph and Rhyl closed in 1955, leaving Denbigh on a lengthy branch running from Chester via Mold and Denbigh to Ruthin, which closed in 1962. A southern continuation beyond Ruthin linking up with the Great Western Railway at Corwen had closed in 1952. The platform of Denbigh station can still be seen beside the road leading to the Home Bargains store.

North Wales Hospital
At one time the majority of the population sought employment at the North Wales Hospital, which, dating back to the 1840s, cared for people with psychiatric illnesses. The hospital closed in 1995 and has since fallen into disrepair. In October 2008, a special series of episodes of Most Haunted, titled 'Village of the Damned', was broadcast from the North Wales Hospital over 7 days. As of October 2018, the derelict building has passed into the ownership of Denbighshire County Council.

Futura Cinema
Denbigh had a town cinema on Love Lane. It opened as the Scala in 1928 before being re-branded as the Wedgwood Cinema in the late 1970s. It closed in October 1980 and was re-opened by Lewis Colwell in 1982 and renamed the Futura Cinema. The cinema closed in the 1990s, but the building remained open as a video rental store. In 1995, Peter Moore re-opened the cinema for a short period before being arrested and convicted of the murder of four men. The video rental store closed and the building is now in ruin awaiting redevelopment. Denbigh has no permanent cinema, though Denbigh Film Club regularly operates in Theatr Twm o'r Nant.

Population
The population at the 2001 Census was 8,783, increasing to 8,986 in the 2011 census.

Amenities
Attractions in the town include Denbigh Library, Denbigh Castle and the castle walls, Cae Dai 1950s museum, Theatr Twm o'r Nant, medieval parish church St Marcella's, and a small shopping complex. Denbigh Boxing Club is located on Middle Lane. Denbigh Community Hospital was established in 1807. Denbigh Town Hall is a Grade II* listed building.

Denbigh Cricket Club is one of the oldest cricket clubs in Wales having been established in 1844. The club plays at the Ystrad Road ground and plays in the North Wales Cricket League. The 1st XI play in the Premier Division having won the Division 1 championship in 2010 with the 2nd XI in Division 3.

For over 50 years, a barrel rolling competition has been held on Boxing Day in the town square.

Secondary schools
There are three secondary schools located in Denbigh. Denbigh High School is the larger of the two, consisting of nearly 600 pupils and approximately 60 staff. The current headmaster is Dr. Paul Evans.

St Bridget's is a Catholic voluntary aided school on Mold Road on the outskirts of the town which caters for pupils between the ages of 3 – 19. There is a strict admissions policy and until recently the school only accepted girls. The schools current headteacher is Mrs Rona Jones.

Myddleton College is the former Howell's Preparatory School and is an independent co-educational day and boarding school.

All 3 of these High Schools in Denbigh, along with Ysgol Brynhyfryd (Ruthin), Ysgol Glan Clwyd (St Asaph), Denbigh College, and Llysfasi College (Deeside) have joined to offer a combined 6th form under the title ‘The Dyffryn Clwyd Consortium’.

Site of Special Scientific Interest
Crest Mawr Wood (alt. - Crêst) is a Site of Special Scientific Interest to the north west, adjoining Denbigh Golf Club and the Tarmac Quarry, an historic and ancient deciduous woodland. This woodland is endangered due to environmental pressure and competing land use in the area.

National Eisteddfodau
Denbigh hosted the National Eisteddfod of Wales in 1882, 1939, 2001 and 2013.

Notable people

Rhoda Broughton (1840–1920), novelist
Elizabeth Casson (1881–1954) doctor and occupational therapy pioneer.
Shefali Chowdhury (born 1988), actor, notably in the Harry Potter films
Connor Marc Colquhoun (born 1996), known online as CDawgVA, Anime Youtuber and podcaster, presenter of Trash Taste
Robert Dudley, 1st Earl of Leicester (1532–1588), also known as Baron of Denbigh
Thomas Gee (1815–1898), a Welsh Nonconformist preacher, journalist and publisher.
David Griffith (1800–1894), known as "Clwydfardd" a Welsh poet and Archdruid of the National Eisteddfod of Wales.
Dr Samuel Johnson (1709–1784), visited friends and relation in Denbigh many times and has an urn memorial in his honour in the woods nearby.
Professor Edward Taylor Jones FRSE (1872–1961), physicist
Eirian Llwyd (1951–2014), printmaker and wife of former Plaid Cymru leader Ieuan Wyn Jones
Humphrey Llwyd (1527–1568), a Welsh cartographer, author, antiquary and MP.
Sir Hugh Myddleton (1560–1631), royal jeweller, goldsmith and entrepreneur.
Thomas Myddelton (1550–1631) a Welsh merchant, Lord Mayor of London & MP
Twm o'r Nant (1739–1810), playwright, real name Thomas Edwards
Beatrix Potter (1866–1943), spent summers with her aunt and uncle at Gwaenynog Hall between 1895 and 1913 and used their large garden as inspiration for The Tale of Peter Rabbit
Susan Reynolds (1929–2021) a medieval historian
Kate Roberts (1891–1985), Welsh language writer.
Several members of the Salusbury Family, who represented Denbigh over the years.
Sir Henry Morton Stanley (1841–1904), a journalist and explorer
Mark Webster (born 1983) Welsh darts international, winner of the BDO World Darts Championship 2008
Bryn Williams (born 1977), TV chef who won the Great British Menu BBC TV programme.

Gallery

References

External links

 
BBC Wales's Denbigh website
http://cadw.wales.gov.uk/docs/cadw/publications/Urban_Character_Denbigh_EN.pdf

Denbigh
Former county towns in Wales
Towns in Denbighshire